The Mask Singer Season 3 is a Thai singing competition program presented by Kan Kantathavorn. It aired on Workpoint TV on Thursday at 20:15 from 7 September 2017 to 1 February 2018.

Panel of Judges

First round

Group A

Group B

Group C

Group D

Semi-final

Group A

Group B

Group C

Group D

Final

Champ VS Champ

First round

Second round

Champ of the Champ

Celebration of The Mask Champion

Elimination table

References

The Mask Singer (Thai TV series)
2017 Thai television seasons
2018 Thai television seasons